Eulepidotis viridissima is a moth of the family Erebidae first described by Constant Bar in 1876. It is found in the Neotropics, including Costa Rica, Peru, Ecuador, French Guiana and Guyana.

References

Moths described in 1876
viridissima